David Michael Trembley (born October 31, 1951) is an American professional baseball executive who served as director of player development of the Atlanta Braves in .  Trembley has been the bench coach for the Houston Astros, and a manager of the Baltimore Orioles.  Before managing the Orioles, Trembley was a minor league manager for twenty seasons, compiling a 1,369–1,413 record. He won two league titles and earned Manager of the Year awards in three leagues. In December 2001, Baseball America selected him as one of minor league baseball's top five managers of the previous 20 years. He served as a coach in the inaugural Futures Game in 1999 and also served as manager for the Southern League and Double-A All-Star Games that season. Trembley has worked for the Baltimore Orioles, Chicago Cubs, Pittsburgh Pirates, San Diego Padres and Atlanta Braves.

Coaching career

High school and minors
Trembley taught and coached baseball for three years (1977–79) at Daniel Murphy High School in Los Angeles and was the head baseball coach for five years (1980–84) at Antelope Valley College in Los Angeles County, where he also was a physical education instructor.

He began his career in professional baseball as a Los Angeles-area scout for the Chicago Cubs in 1984. The next season, he became an instructor in the Cubs minor league system until June, when he was named to coach at their Wytheville club in the Appalachian League. Trembley left the Cubs organization to embark on his managing career with the unaffiliated Kinston Eagles franchise of the Class A Carolina League in 1986.  It began a stretch in which he would manage in the minors in 20 of the ensuing 21 years (the lone exception being the 1990 season).

He joined the Pirates organization in 1987, and skippered their AA Harrisburg Senators of the Eastern League for three seasons, capturing an EL title and being named the loop's Manager of the Year. He was named the Minor League Manager of the Year by Baseball America in 1987. At the end of the 1989 season, he managed the Eastern League All-Star Team that toured the Soviet Union Diamond Diplomacy Tour. In 1990 he served as Director of the day-to-day operation of Pittsburgh's minor league complex and spring training facility at Bradenton, Florida.

Trembley was hired by the San Diego Padres in 1991, and managed their Class A South Atlantic League affiliate Charleston (SC) Rainbows in 1991 and 1992.  He spent the 1993 season guiding the AA Wichita Wranglers before rejoining the Cubs organization, where he managed nine years (1994–2002) at three different levels. Trembley earned his second league title and Manager of the Year honor in 1995 when he led Class A Daytona to the Florida State League title, and also was named Manager of the Year in the Southern League in 1999 after guiding the Class AA West Tenn Diamond Jaxx to first-place finishes in each half of the split-season. Trembley was named the Class A Manager of the Year in 1995 by USA Today/Baseball Weekly.

Trembley joined the Baltimore Orioles organization after he was named manager of the Bowie Baysox on January 27, 2003. His hiring was part of the Orioles' plan to improve its underachieving farm system with an emphasis on fundamentals and discipline. Taking over a ballclub that had ended its previous three seasons in or below fifth place in the Eastern League's Southern Division, he led the Baysox to fourth at 69–72 in 2003. The -game improvement earned him the organization's Cal Ripken, Sr. Player Development Award. The only Orioles affiliate to post a winning record in 2004, the Baysox finished above .500 for the first time since 1997 at 73–69. Trembley achieved his 1,200th victory as a minor-league manager during that campaign in a win over the Binghamton Mets on July 9. He managed the Eastern League All Star Team that season (2004). He moved up to the Ottawa Lynx in a similar capacity, replacing Tim Leiper on December 2, 2004. Trembley managed the Orioles' AAA team, the Ottawa Lynx, in 2005 and 2006, combining to go 143–144.

Trembley was promoted to Baltimore's major league coaching staff when he was named the team's bullpen coach on February 14, 2007. He succeeded Rick Dempsey, who joined the Mid-Atlantic Sports Network as the primary studio analyst for Orioles game telecasts. He was the major league field coordinator as well as the bullpen coach during Spring Training in 2007, and later was the interim bench coach, replacing Tom Trebelhorn, who left the club to attend to a family matter. In addition to his tenure in organized Minor League Baseball, Trembley also managed one winter at Navajoa in the Mexican Pacific League, and coached third base for two years for Magallanes in the Venezuelan Winter League. He managed 16 seasons in the Florida and Arizona Instructional League. Trembley managed the Florida State League All Star Game in 1995. He was added to the major league coaching staff as a September call up in 1998 with the Chicago Cubs, and in 2003 and 2006 with the Baltimore Orioles.

Orioles manager
Trembley was named interim manager of the Orioles following Sam Perlozzo's dismissal on June 18, 2007. He inherited a 29–40 ballclub that was mired in last place in the American League (AL) East and in the midst of an eight-game losing streak. As a result of a 29–25 stretch, he had the interim tag removed from his title as his contract was extended through the 2008 season on August 22. Later that same night, the Orioles began a nine-game losing streak by surrendering the most runs ever in an AL contest in a 30–3 defeat to the Texas Rangers in the first game of a two-night doubleheader at Camden Yards. The team avoided last place in the AL East despite losing 28 of its last 39 contests.

The Orioles exercised their option on Trembley's contract through the 2009 season on September 5, 2008, even though they were in last place at 63–76. They finished at the bottom of the division this time by dropping 17 of its final 22 games, including ten in a row. His contract was similarly extended again a year later on October 2, 2009, despite another last-place finish, a worse record and a 24–50 performance after the All-Star break. The moves were made because the team was in a rebuilding phase, and it was hoped that his emphasis on fundamentals would help the development of its young players.

With the Orioles still stuck in last place in the AL East with a major-league-worst 15–39 record and an eight-game losing streak, Trembley was fired on June 4, 2010 and replaced by third-base coach Juan Samuel. The ballclub's 2–16 start was the second worst in franchise history. They were also stricken by a rash of injuries and the lowest run production in the majors a third into the campaign. Trembley had become a target for increasing criticism from fans who felt his disciplinary approach was too soft and that he mishandled the bullpen. Details of the latter included overworking his relief pitchers and putting them in situations to fail. His tenure lasted just under three years with a 187–283 record. His .398 win percentage was the second-lowest in club history behind Jimmy Dykes' .351 mark in 1954, the franchise's first season in Baltimore.

Post-Baltimore

Trembley was the minor league field coordinator for the Atlanta Braves during the 2011 and 2012 seasons. On October 19, 2012, Trembley was announced to be a member of the 2013 Houston Astros coaching staff. Later that year, it was announced Trembley would be the third base coach. Trembley was relieved of his duties as the Houston Astros bench coach on September 1, 2014, and rejoined the Braves as director of player development in October 2014.  In March 2022, Trembley was named manager of the State College Spikes, a collegiate summer baseball team of the MLB Draft League based in State College, Pennsylvania.

Personal life
Trembley has a bachelor's degree in physical education and a master's degree in education, both from the State University of New York at Brockport. He also did graduate work in sports psychology at Penn State. In the offseason, Trembley, his wife, Patti, and their son, Kevin, live in Daytona Beach Shores, Florida. He was inducted into the Lancaster JetHawks Baseball Hall of Fame in 2008, Antelope Valley College Sports Hall of Fame in 2009, the Florida State League Hall of Fame in 2012, and the State University of New York at Brockport Hall of Fame October 3, 2015.

Managerial record

References

External links

 

1951 births
Living people
People from Carthage, New York
Atlanta Braves executives
Baltimore Orioles coaches
Baltimore Orioles managers
Houston Astros coaches
Iowa Cubs managers
Antelope Valley Marauders baseball coaches
Major League Baseball bench coaches
Major League Baseball bullpen coaches
Major League Baseball farm directors
Major League Baseball third base coaches
Minor league baseball managers
Pennsylvania State University alumni
State University of New York at Brockport alumni